Greigs Flat is a locality in the Bega Valley Shire of New South Wales, Australia.

Greigs Flat Public School opened in November 1869 and closed in December 1951. It was half-time with the school at Lochiel until January 1873, a provisional school from February to December 1888, and a public school from January 1889 to February 1944 and from November 1946 to December 1951. It was known as Yowaka Public School after 1942. Politician Francis Bland attended the school as a child.

Heritage listings
Greigs Flat has a number of heritage-listed sites, including:
 Princes Highway: Greigs Flat Bridge over Yowaka River

References

Localities in New South Wales
Bega Valley Shire